A list of films produced in France in 1977.

See also
1977 in France
1977 in French television

Notes

External links
 French films of 1977 at the Internet Movie Database
French films of 1977 at Cinema-francais.fr

1977
Films
French